Loves Creek is a  long 3rd order tributary to the Rocky River in Chatham County, North Carolina.

Course
Loves Creek rises in a pond about 3 miles south-southwest of Siler City, North Carolina in Chatham County.  Loves Creek then flows northeast through Siler City to join the Rocky River about 1 mile east of Siler City.

Watershed
Loves Creek drains  of area, receives about 48.0 in/year of precipitation, has a wetness index of 428.39 and is about 40% forested.

References

Rivers of North Carolina
Rivers of Chatham County, North Carolina